Tai Po New Town, or Tai Po Town, is a new town (satellite town) and non-administrative area in Tai Po District, in the New Territories, Hong Kong. The area is a planned town that surrounding the existing indigenous market towns Tai Po Hui (literally Tai Po Market, was known as Tai Wo Shi in the 1900s) and Tai Po Kau Hui (Tai Po Old Market), as well as east of the existing indigenous villages that located on the Lam Tsuen Valley as well as west of those villages in Ting Kok and Tai Mei Tuk and south of those villages in Nam Hang, Fung Yuen and Sha Lo Tung. Most of the lands of the new town were obtained by land reclamation. In present day, Tai Po New Town was simply known as Tai Po. The new town are largely covered by the government Tai Po Outline Zoning Plan, which legally regulated the land use of the area, on top of the terms in the land lease contract with the government. Some of the land lease within the area, were known as Tai Po Town Lot № foo. In election, the town had a different zoning scheme for the election constituencies.

History of developments

The new town was designed to be expanded from and incorporate the previously existing areas of Tai Po Market (Tai Po Hui; formerly known as Tai Wo Shi) and Tai Po Old Market (Tai Po Kau Hui, the former site of Tai Po Hui), traditional market towns that served both rural villages of Tang clan Tai Po branch and non-Tang's village alliance  (literally Tai Po Seven Alliances) as well as people by water route from Ma On Shan and other places. The market towns were established in the Qing dynasty. After the concession of the area now known as the New Territories and New Kowloon to the British Empire, the colonial Hong Kong government also established the District Office North (founded as District Office which also oversee villages that belongs to the present day Sha Tin District), an administrate department, in the area that belongs to the modern day Tai Po New Town in 1907. The building was next to the former site of the Tai Po police station, as well as the Island House, the residence of the District Officer. The market towns received expansion in the 1960s, due to the relocation of indigenous villages to the newly reclaimed land that next to the Tai Po Market, as well as the construction of Tai Po Industrial Estate which started in 1974. From 1976, extensive reclamation work was carried out near the mouth of the Lam Tsuen River in Tolo Harbour (or known as Tai Po Hoi, literally Tai Po Sea) in order to create land for the new town.

The new town was a planned area, which " suitable sites have been reserved for various types of land-uses including residential, commercial, industrial and open space, and for the provision of different types of community and infrastructural facilities to meet the needs of the population." The new town was divided between residential and industrial areas, with a mix of public and private housing. The Tai Po Industrial Estate southwest of Ting Kok is one of the major industrial estates in Hong Kong. The gas factory of Hong Kong and China Gas was located in the estate. As of 2018, the estate also consists of tenants such as Asia Television, AsiaSat, APT Satellite, Oriental Press Group, South China Morning Post Publishers etc.. Tai Po New Town also had a smaller industrial area known as Tai Ping Industrial Centre.

The new town was served by two railway stations (now part of the mass transit system of the city), new Tai Po Market station and Tai Wo station respectively. Tai Po Kau railway station and old Tai Po Market railway station, however, were closed in 1983. The latter which previously served the traditional market town Tai Po Market (Tai Wo Shi), became the Hong Kong Railway Museum, one of the public museums of Tai Po District. In terms of road transport, Tolo Highway was completed in the 1980s, which largely replaced Tai Po Road as the main road between the new town and city centre.

One of the earliest development of the present day Tai Po new town, were multi-storied estates on newly reclaimed land on  circa the 1960s to 1970s. Despite those buildings are now much older than other buildings of the new town, as well as now part of the Tai Po District Council Election Constituency Tai Po Hui, the area could traced back to its origins in the Plover Cove by the name of the local street Luk Heung Lane, a namesake of Luk Heung (literally Six Villages), as well as an ancestral hall. Those villages from Luk Heung conducted their business activities in Sha Tau Kok market town in the past. , or known as the "Four Lanes" were also built circa the 1960s.

In 1972, the Executive Council, the de facto cabinet of the Hong Kong colonial government, had approved a 10-year housing plan, which included a proposed expansion of Tai Po, Fanling–Sheung Shui-Shek Wu Hui and Yuen Long as new towns.

In 1976, Tai Po New Town project was formally announced. Differ from Luk Heung San Tsuen, which was a relocation of rural population to the rural town centre, the new town project was an influx of urban population from the existing built-up area of the city.

In 1980, the first public rental housing estate of the new town, Tai Yuen Estate, was completed. It was followed by Fu Heng Estate, Fu Shin Estate, Kwong Fuk Estate, Tai Wo Estate and Wan Tau Tong Estate (in alphabetical order); Po Heung Estate was the latest public rental housing estate of Tai Po in the Tai Po Market area as a re-development project of existing public facility of the traditional market town. The establishment of Tai Wo Estate and Tai Wo station, also shifted the area that corresponded to the name Tai Wo, from Tai Po Market (was established as Tai Wo Shi; at the time of establishment, Tai Po Old Market was known as Tai Po Market) to the area around Tai Wo Estate. The new town also composed of many private housing estates, as well as public-private housing estates that were subsidized under the Home Ownership Scheme.

The New Town project also made Yuen Chau Tsai fishing village obsoleted. Fishermen that formerly lived on their boats, were relocated in the 1970s, initially to the temporary housing area such as Yue Kok, and then public housing estate. Yuen Chau Tsai now known for Island House, a fishermen temple Tai Wong Yeh Temple, and nearby Yuen Chau Tsai Park.

Wong Shiu Chi Secondary School, SKH Bishop Mok Sau Tseng Secondary School and Carmel Pak U Secondary School, all subsidized secondary schools, was founded in 1960, 1975 and 1979 respectively. , was founded in 1984 and folded in 2014. As of 2018, there were 19 secondary schools in the whole Tai Po District, all within the Tai Po New Town.

Alice Ho Miu Ling Nethersole Hospital, was relocated to Tai Po New Town in 1997. The town was previously served by the Prince of Wales Hospital in the Sha Tin District. In 1997, the Hong Kong Institute of Education, a tertiary public school, moved to its Tai Po new campus. Both facilities were built on existing hilly area of the new town.

According to the Civil Engineering and Development Department of Hong Kong, Hong Kong Science Park in Pak Shek Kok, was also within the scope of Tai Po New Town. However, in later document, the new town project was renamed to "Tai Po New Town and Pak Shek Kok Development". Pak Shek Kok was served by the University station of MTR.

In urban planning
In the Town Planning Board of Hong Kong, the area was known as "Tai Po Outline Zoning Plan" (Tai Po OZP). The zoning plan roughly covered the Tai Po New Town (including Tai Po Industrial Estate), as well as Tai Po Market and Tai Po Old Market. The zoning plan also covered some of the indigenous villages of Tai Po District, but indigenous villages on the Lam Tsuen Valley, were regulated by Lam Tsuen Outline Zoning Plan instead. The aforementioned science park and surrounding residential area in Pak Shek Kok, had its own OZP: Pak Shek Kok (East) Outline Zoning Plan. Other area of the Tai Po District, such as northern Sai Kung Peninsula were belonged to other OZPs of the board.

Scrapped facilities
It was reported that the area of the modern day Tai Wo Estate, a public housing project in the west edge of the new town, was planned for industrial use. However, the plan was scrapped in 1983.

The new town currently had a public auditorium and theatre, Tai Po Civic Centre, which was opened in 1985 on On Pong Road, next to private housing estate . A larger facility, Tai Po Town Hall, which could compare to Sha Tin Town Hall, was planned in the new town, east of private housing estate Plover Cove Garden. However, the construction of such facility was scrapped or postponed indefinitely. Another facility, Tai Po Public Library, was separated from the planned town hall, and incorporated into , a new government building that was completed in 2004. The complex was a re-development project within the older area of Tai Po in Tai Po Market. Government had used part of the shopping centre of Plover Cove Garden as the temporary site of the public library for more than a decade. In 2016, government proposed to built Tai Po Sports Centre, Tai Po Community Hall and two 7-a-side football fields, on the existing planned site of Tai Po Town Hall.

Future developments
In 2012, Hong Kong government proposed 25 new land reclamation sites in a public consultation. In those 25 sites, some of them are located in the Tai Po District which near to the existing Tai Po new town. In particular, the residents of Tai Po against the sites near Plover Cove, Tai Po Waterfront Park and Tai Po Kau by forming online interest group. Another proposed site near Pak Shek Kok in the Tolo Harbour, had also gathered more than 3,000 signatures in a petition. Of those 25 sites, only 6 of them were included in the stage 2 public consultation, which only included the aforementioned the Tolo Harbour, but excluding the three other sites that near to the Tai Po New Town. In 2018, one of the 6 sites in the stage 2 consultation, became a new project known as Lantau Tomorrow Vision. However, many citizen and environmental protection organization against the project. Our Hong Kong Foundation, a pro-government think tank, had employed  of the Chinese University of Hong Kong to conduct a survey. The survey shown 45.3% agreed reclamation outside the Victoria Harbour, while 33.9% against. In February 2019, the government announced that "it has fully accepted the recommendations tendered by the Task Force on Land Supply," including using reclamation as a mean to obtain new lands for development. However, it was also announced that the reclamation plan of Ma Liu Shui in Tolo Harbour was postponed, despite it was included in the recommendations by the Task Force. Thus, it was uncertain that the reclamations in the water of Tolo Harbour would go ahead or not.

Cityscape

See also
 Tai Wo: a place name in Tai Po New Town, which the name was referred to Tai Po Market in the past but currently refer to Tai Wo Estate

References

External links
 
 About Tai Po New Town

New towns in Hong Kong
 
New towns started in the 1970s